= Ruggiero Gabaleone di Salmour =

Italian politician and economist

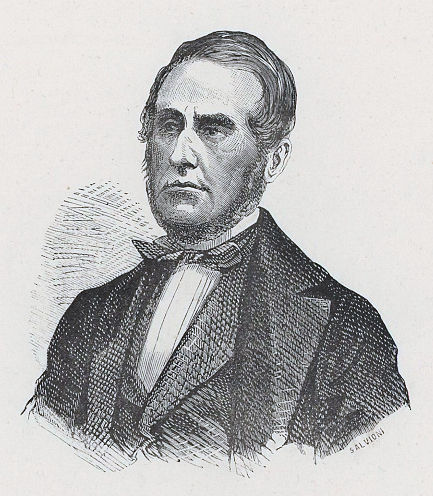
Ruggiero Gabaleone di Salmour, 1861

Ruggiero Gabaleone di Salmour (January 14, 1806 – March 6, 1878) was an Italian politician and economist. He served in the Senate of the Kingdom of Sardinia.

== Works ==
- Notizie sopra le principali Istituzioni di credito agrario, Torino, 1845.
- Del credito fondiario negli Stati Sardi, Torino, 1853.
- Del credito fondiario e del credito agricolo in Francia e in Italia, Torino, 1862.
